Kim Tae-hwan (born the 12 from July from 1992), is a South Korean actor and model. 

Kim debuted in the Chinese drama My Amazing Boyfriend, which was based on the novel "我的奇妙男友" by young author 水阡墨 (QianMo Shui). Many people compare this drama to the popular K-drama "My Love From Another Star", although they are completely different except that the male lead is immortal. This drama "My Amazing Boyfriend" was a huge success, passing the billions mark within one week of streaming on Tencent.

Filmography

Television drama

Web series

References 

21st-century South Korean male actors
South Korean male models
1993 births
Living people
South Korean male television actors
Place of birth missing (living people)